Emilian Necula (born 24 May 1960), known also as Emil Necula is a Romanian former rugby union player. He played as Number 8. He is nicknamed Ene.

Career
Necula's first cap for Romania was during the match against Italy in Constanta, on 
In the same year, he also was in the Romania team for 1987 Rugby World Cup, where he only played one match in the tournament, against France on 28 May 1987, in Wellington, which was his second and last international test cap. At club level, Necula played for Farul Constanța in Divizia Nationala, with which he won the 1974, 1975 and 1977 titles.

Honours
Farul Constanța
 Cupa României: 1974-1975, 1975-1975, 1977-1978

References

External links

1960 births
Living people
Romanian rugby union players
Romania international rugby union players
Rugby union number eights